Robert Cook may refer to:

Politics
 Robert Cook (Australian politician) (1867–1930), Australian politician
 Robert E. Cook (1920–1988), American attorney, politician, and judge
 Robin Cook (1946–2005), British Labour Party politician
 Bob Cook, candidate in the 2002 Winnipeg municipal election for city councillor of Transcona Ward
 Robert Cook, 14th-century Member of the Parliament of England for Dunwich
 Robert Douglas Cook, Canadian political candidate for the Gay Alliance Toward Equality

Sports
 Robert Cook (swimmer) (born 1932), Bermudian former swimmer
 Robert Cook (wrestler) (1903–1963), British wrestler
 Bob Cook (1946–1978), Canadian ice hockey player

Others
 Robert Cook (vegan) (1646–1726), Irish eccentric farmer and early veganism activist
 Robert Cook (veterinarian), equine veterinarian
 Robert A. Cook (1912–1991), president of The King's College in New York
 Robert Barclay Cook (born 1966), British hotelier
 Robert C. Cook (1898–1991), American geneticist and demographer
 Robert Edwin Cook (1863–1946), American architect and engineer
 Robert F. Cook (1880–1958), Christian missionary in India
 Robert L. Cook (born 1952), computer graphics researcher and developer
 Robert Manuel Cook (1909–2000), classical scholar and classical archaeologist from England
 Robert O. Cook (1903–1995), American sound engineer
 Robert Percival Cook (1906–1989), Australian-born biochemist
 Robert Raymond Cook (1937–1960), Canadian mass murderer
 Veda Hlubinka-Cook (born Robert Cook), video game programmer and co-founder of Metaweb
 Derek Raymond (pen name of Robert William Arthur Cook; 1931–1994), English crime writer

See also
 Robert Coke (disambiguation)
 Cook (surname)
 Bert Cook (disambiguation)
 Bobby Cook (disambiguation)
 Rob Cook (disambiguation)
 Robert Cooke (disambiguation)